The Carolina and Cumberland Gap Railway was a railroad in the Southeastern United States that existed in the late 19th century.

Charter
The line was chartered by the South Carolina General Assembly in 1882, but was not built until 1896.

Sale
It was acquired by the Southern Railway in June 1898.

See also
 Atlantic and French Broad Valley Railroad
 Belton, Williamston and Easley Railroad
 Carolina, Cumberland Gap and Chicago Railway
 Edgefield Branch Railroad
 Edgefield, Trenton and Aiken Railroad
 French Broad and Atlantic Railway

References

Defunct South Carolina railroads
Predecessors of the Southern Railway (U.S.)
Railway companies established in 1896
Railway companies disestablished in 1898
1898 mergers and acquisitions